This is list of rosters for the UCI Pro-Continental team  by season.

2022

2021

2020

2019

2018

2017

2016 
Roster in 2016, age as of 1 January 2016:

2015

2014

2013
As of 1 January 2013.

2012
As of 8 May 2012.

2011
As of January 1, 2011.

2010
As of January 1, 2010.

2009
As of March 4, 2009.

2008
As of February 12, 2008.

2006

References

Lists of cyclists by team